The North American eighth generation Honda Accord is a mid-size car introduced in August 2007 for the 2008 model year. It is also marketed in parts of Asia and Australasia, and as the Honda Inspire in Japan.

2007 Accord Coupe Concept
The Honda Accord Coupe concept car was unveiled at the 2007 North American International Auto Show. It previewed the production 2-door model with i-VTEC VCM V6 engine and Advanced Compatibility Engineering body structure. 

A hybrid version would no longer be offered, as Honda felt their "hybrid system works better on smaller cars".

The production sedan and coupe were unveiled on August 21, 2007. Sales of US models began on September 12, 2007 for the sedan, and on September 20, 2007 for the coupe.

HF-S concept
At the 2007 SEMA Show, Honda unveiled a concept Accord coupe showcasing Honda Factory Performance products.

North America production and marketing
The North American Honda Accord is sold alongside its platform-mates that are under the Acura luxury marque, the smaller Japanese/European Accord which is badge engineered as the second-generation Acura TSX, and the fourth-generation Acura TL.

A crossover fastback variant of the North American Honda Accord was sold as the Accord Crosstour for the 2010-11 model years, and then spun off into its own separate line as the Crosstour for the 2012-15 model years.

Trim levels
In Canada, for the 2008-10 model years, the sedan trims consist of the LX, EX, EX-L, EX-L with Navigation, EX-V6, EX-L V6, and EX-L V6 with Navigation, while coupes have the EX, EX-L, EX-L with Navigation, and EX-L V6 with Navigation. The LX is powered by a 2.4L DOHC i-VTEC inline-4 engine making 177 hp mated to either a five-speed manual transmission or five-speed automatic transmission, and is equipped with anti-lock brakes with brake assist and electronic brake force distribution, electronic stability control, front and rear disc brakes, air conditioning, keyless entry, power windows, power locks, and cruise control as standard features, while also having body-colored door handles and mirrors. The EX includes a more powerful version of the inline-4 engine with 190 hp, power moonroof, 17-inch alloy wheels, 8-way power adjustable driver's seat, security system, and a 6-disc CD changer. EX-L denotes Accords with leather upholstery, XM satellite radio, and an optional navigation system and hands-free Bluetooth interface. V6 models have a 3.5 liter 268 hp i-VTEC V6 engine with VCM mated to a five-speed automatic transmission, chrome handles, dual exhaust pipes, and fog lamps. V6 coupes have 18-inch alloy rims and a rear lip spoiler. V6 coupes with the optional six-speed close ratio manual transmission used the non-VCM VTEC variant of the J35 engine.

The United States include all the trims found in Canada, while also offering the LX-P (Premium) sedan, which adds illuminated power window switches, an 8-way driver's seat, security alarm, and 16-inch alloy wheels, and the LX-S (Sport) coupe, which replaces the 177 hp engine with a 190 hp, 17-inch alloy wheels, and a 6-disc CD changer.

In the United States, PZEV (Partial Zero Emissions Vehicle) configurations are available, for all 4-cylinder engines, and V6 i-VTEC VCM engines with 5-speed automatic transmissions. PZEV engines include 2 modes of exhaust valve operation. At Below 2,500 rpm, only 1 exhaust valve operates, creating a strong rotational flow in the exhaust gases that creates a "thermal reactor" effect to reduce hydrocarbon emissions. Above 2,500 rpm where exhaust flow increases, a hydraulically actuated pin locks the rockers for both exhaust valves together so they operate in unison, following a single cam profile. Due to a smaller profit margin on a PZEV for the manufacturer, Honda does not offer PZEV versions of the Accord outside California, Florida, Vermont, Connecticut, Arizona, Maryland, Massachusetts, Pennsylvania, New York, Oregon, Maine, New Jersey, Rhode Island, New Mexico and Washington.

2011 update
Both the Accord sedan and coupe received a facelift for the 2011 model year. Both cars feature new front fascias and updated tail lamps. The sedan features the reflective strips seen on the Japanese Honda Inspire. Inside, Honda has added steering wheel-mounted paddle shifters to the EX-L V6 Coupe, and USB connectivity for all coupe models and EX/EX-L sedans. A rearview camera is now standard with the available navigation system on the sedan. EX-L V6 models gain memory seats and all models get new cloth seats and some minor instrument panel and control modifications. In Canada a SE trim replaced the LX as the entry-level trim but was largely similar save for 16-inch alloy wheels. In the United States, a SE trim was slotted between the LX-P and EX, with the SE being largely similar to the LX-P but adding leather upholstery. New improved aerodynamics and a reworked five-speed automatic transmission help the Accord achieve 23 mpg (city) and 34 mpg (hwy).

Production (United States)

The North American 4-cylinder and V6 Accords were first assembled in Honda's Marysville, Ohio, plant.  With the eighth generation this plant is now the sole global source of the Accord coupe. Beginning in mid-2009, the majority of the V6 Accord sedan production was moved to the Honda auto plant in Lincoln, Alabama. Honda's Anna, Ohio, Engine Plant produces the 4-cylinder engines. The US plants supply the majority of Accords to both North and South America.

Global production and marketing

A right-hand-drive variant of the North American Accord model is sold as the fifth-generation Honda Inspire in Japan. In South Korea, the success of the North American Accord pushed Honda ahead of BMW, Mercedes-Benz and Lexus, to become the number one import brand as sales of Honda vehicles surged 95% in the first seven months in that year. 

Variants of the North American Accord models are manufactured for the domestic markets in China and Taiwan, with Guangzhou Honda (renamed Guangqi Honda in 2009) producing it since 2007. 

The North American Accord model is also assembled in Thailand for sale in Southeast Asia, Australia and New Zealand. Since the North American Accord is sold alongside the Japanese-built Accord (European-spec) in the Australian and New Zealand markets under the same marque (as opposed to in Canada and the United States where the Euro-spec Accord is sold as the Acura TSX), the smaller of the two cars is badged as the Accord Euro, while in New Zealand only the V6-powered version of the North American Accord was available so it got badged as the Accord V6.

Honda entered a strategic collaboration with Proton of Malaysia in October 2012 as part of Japan's Abenomics plan. The result of the collaboration was the Proton Perdana, a rebadged eighth generation Honda Accord which launched on 11 December 2013, for exclusive sale to the Malaysian government and civil servants. It serves as the replacement to the ageing Mitsubishi Galant-based Proton Perdana V6 fleet in use since the 1990s.

Mechanical

Engines

The V6 i-VTEC VCM engines feature improved fuel efficiency due to the Variable Cylinder Management (VCM) system, which shuts off two or three of the cylinders depending on the type of driving (i.e. city driving, uphill/downhill driving, highway driving) Engines lacking VCM results in a decrease of 4 MPG in highway fuel economy.

The V6 engines were re-rated in 2009 model year.

Transmissions

Chassis
The North American Accord uses the CP2 chassis code for the 2.4-liter 4-cylinder sedan and CS1 for the 4-cylinder coupe.  CP3 is for the V6 sedan and CS2 is for the V6 coupe. CP1 is for the 2.0-liter 4-cylinder sedan in the Chinese and Brazilian markets.

Safety
The Accord comes standard with a wide range of safety features carried over from earlier model years including dual stage, dual threshold front airbags, side impact airbags, side curtain airbags, and seat belts with front pretensioners and load limiters.

The Accord standard safety updates for the 2008 model year include vehicle stability assist (VSA) and traction control, anti-lock brakes with brake assist and electronic brake force distribution, tire pressure monitoring system, active front head restraints, new dual chamber side impact airbags, and the ACE Body Structure for all models.
The Accord is the first mid-size car in its class to include stability and traction control as standard equipment across the lineup.

IIHS
In Insurance Institute for Highway Safety (IIHS) tests the Accord sedan received the top "Good" rating in 13 of 14 measured categories, while receiving an "Acceptable" rating in the structure/safety cage category of the side impact test, earning it a "Top Safety Pick" designation from the IIHS, an honor not bestowed upon most of the Accord's competitors.  The Accord lost this award due to its "Acceptable" score in roof strength evaluations. 2012 models have been given the Top Safety Pick award back with its "Good" rating in the roof strength test.

In an IIHS study of vehicle fatalities, the Accord was found to have the lowest vehicle fatality rate in the non-luxury midsize sedan class. Among luxury midsize sedan class models only the Saab 9-3 had a lower fatality rate.

NHTSA

Brake wear class action lawsuit 
In September 2009, a class action was filed alleging that "the braking system on 2008, 2009, and certain 2010 Honda Accord vehicles as well as 2009 and certain 2010 Acura TSX vehicles ... suffers from a defect that causes excessive force to be applied to the vehicles' rear wheels. One consequence of this defect is that the vehicles' rear brake pads wear out and require replacement about every 15,000 to 20,000 miles, far more frequently than in a properly functioning braking system." On April 6, 2010, a preliminary settlement to the class action was announced where Honda would reimburse owners for a portion of their prior brake repair expenses, and Honda would also pay up to $150 for owners to have redesigned brake pads installed. Final court approval of the settlement was granted on July 29, 2010.

Sudden Airbag Deployment Recall 
Some 2008-2009 Honda Accords - both coupe and sedan - have been reported to have sudden airbag deployment problems, in which the side curtain airbags on the passenger side deploy unexpectedly either by closing the passenger side doors, or while the vehicle is in motion. Honda initially refused to cover the issue under warranty or issue any recalls, claiming to customers that there was no defect in the airbags, and that the system worked properly (despite customers' counterclaims), forcing customers to pay for the airbags themselves. At least 14 injuries were reported by such unexpected deployments. In January 2014, Honda agreed to cooperate with an engineering analysis launched by the NHTSA after receiving 300 complaints regarding the inadvertent deployments. On August 4, 2014, the NHTSA upgraded their analysis to a preliminary investigation of at least 335,195 2008 Accords to see if Honda should issue a recall. In October 2015, Honda agreed to recall 300,000 Accords after discovering that the unexpected deployments were caused by a software problem in the vehicle airbag control unit.

Awards and reception
The eighth generation Accord has received mostly positive reviews, with some noting that its chiseled looks and Teutonic styling is reminiscent of the BMW 3 Series and 5 Series. In its March 2008 issue, Car and Driver placed the 2008 Honda Accord EX first in a comparison test of four-cylinder mid-size sedans against the then recently redesigned/updated Toyota Camry, Nissan Altima, Chevrolet Malibu, Hyundai Sonata, and Dodge Avenger, as well as the Ford Fusion. Edmunds.com InsideLine also placed the LX-P and EX-L V6 Navi sedans first in a comparison against the Nissan Altima, Toyota Camry, and Chevrolet Malibu, praising it for its all-around performance, high build quality, responsive handling, and excellent fuel economy. However, MotorTrend magazine criticized the Accord for being too heavy, feeling not so nimble as the previous model, its polarizing appearance, and for its less-than-stellar showing against the considerably improved Chevrolet Malibu in their 2008 Car of the Year competition. Car and Driver also ranked the Accord EX-L first in a comparison against the second-generation Mazda6 and 2010 Ford Fusion, and the 2011 Honda Accord EX-L V6 has fared well against the newer 2012 Volkswagen Passat 3.6 SEL and the 2012 Hyundai Sonata 2.0T Limited. In a March 2012 comparison test by Car and Driver, the Accord came in second place out of six cars behind the first place Volkswagen Passat.

Several reviewers have considered the Accord Coupe superior to its primary competition, the Nissan Altima Coupe, in all categories such as passenger space, dynamics, and overall refinement.

The Accord is the top pick mid-size vehicle in the Consumer Reports rankings, due to its standard stability control despite having a slightly lower score than the Nissan Altima, while Consumer Guide has named the Accord a "Best Buy". The Accord also won Car and Driver's 10Best trophy in 2008 and 2009, a total of 23 times in the nameplate's history, winning it more times than any other vehicle by far. US sales have been up 9.4%, as SUV buyers shift to the V6 Accord. The 2008 - 2011 Honda Accord was awarded a best-in-class rating of 4 1/2 stars by the JB car pages. The Accord was the most-searched vehicle on CarMax for the fourth consecutive year, due to its high marks in both reliability and comfort.

References

External links

 Honda Accord - Official US site

Accord
Mid-size cars
Sedans
Coupés
2010s cars
Cars introduced in 2007 
Front-wheel-drive vehicles
Motor vehicles manufactured in the United States